The Kettle Valley Steam Railway is a heritage railway near Summerland, British Columbia.

The KVSR operates excursion trains over the only remaining section of the Kettle Valley Railway.  This section runs from Faulder to Trout Creek, running through West Summerland and the Prairie Valley railway station. The line runs through vistas, orchards, vineyards, and over the  Trout Creek Trestle. Trains are operated from spring through fall each year and include special events such as the "Great Train Robbery" and "Christmas Express".

Trains are pulled by ex-Canadian Pacific 2-8-0 steam locomotive  3716 (N-2-b class), built in 1912.  The railway also has an ALCO S-6 diesel electric locomotive (originally Southern Pacific  1050, more recently owned by Portland Terminals, then Neptune Bulk Terminals in North Vancouver). Between 1995 and 2009 a two-truck Shay locomotive, Mayo Lumber  3 was on loan from the BC Forest Discovery Centre in Duncan; it was returned to Duncan on September 17, 2009.  Passenger rolling stock includes two ex-CP coaches and three ex-CP stock cars converted into open-air cars.  All trains depart the Prairie Valley railway station in Summerland.

See also

List of heritage railways in Canada
Kettle Valley Railway

References

External links
 
 

Heritage railways in British Columbia
Okanagan